Ciudad Tunal is a neighbourhood (barrio) of the locality Tunjuelito in Bogotá, Colombia.

Etymology 
The name Tunal is derived from a cacique of the Muisca, Tuna.

References 

Neighbourhoods of Bogotá
Muisca Confederation
Tunal